Thráin can refer to:
 Thráin, a barrow-wight from the Norse legend Hrómundar saga Gripssonar
 Thráin I or Thráin the Old, founder of the Kingdom under the Mountain in Tolkien's Middle-earth
 Thráin II, father of Thorin Oakenshield in Tolkien's Middle-earth

People
"Thráin" is also a transliteration of the Icelandic name "Þráinn" (also rendered as "Thrainn" in some cases). This may refer to:
 Þráinn Bertelsson an Icelandic film director, writer, politician, journalist and newspaper editor
 Þráinn Hjálmarsson an Icelandic composer. 
 Þráinn Orri Jónsson an Icelandic handball player